The Hesketh 308E is a Formula One racing car model built by the Hesketh Racing team in . The 308E was a relatively conservative design, with an aluminium monocoque chassis built around the common Cosworth DFV engine and Hewland gearbox combination. However, the 308E gained particular notoriety owing to Hesketh's team sponsors in 1977 – Penthouse and Rizla – and the resultant livery which incorporated a large rendering of a scantily-clad Penthouse Pet embracing a Rizla packet. During this year, driver Rupert Keegan managed to qualify the car at every race entered although its best finish was only seventh place at the Austrian Grand Prix. For 1978 the team reverted to rather less controversial sponsorship from the Olympus Corporation, although results were less dependable. Following Hesketh's withdrawal from the F1 World Championship the remaining 308Es were run for various competitors in the British Aurora AFX championship.

Complete Formula One World Championship results
(key) (Results in bold indicate pole position; results in italics indicate fastest lap.)

References

Hesketh Formula One cars